Jatun Urqu (Quechua jatun big, urqu mountain, "big mountain", also spelled Jatun Orkho) is a  mountain in the Bolivian Andes. It is located in the Potosí Department, Chayanta Province, Ravelo Municipality. It lies east of the Quri Mayu ("gold river").

References 

Mountains of Potosí Department